New Times was an American glossy bi-weekly national newspaper published from 1973 to 1979 by George A. Hirsch.

History and profile
Hirsch had been publisher of New York magazine, but resigned after conflicts with founder/editor Clay Felker. New Times began as a bridge between the newsweeklies and the more reflective monthly opinion magazines, notably Harper's and The Atlantic. The first issue appeared in October 1972. Initially, the magazine featured a marquee roster of the era's best-known "new journalists," including Jimmy Breslin, Pete Hamill, Jack Newfield, Mike Royko, and Dick Schaap.  

However, as the magazine's ad revenues lagged, contributions from the big names soon dried up, and under the skilled editorship of Jonathan Z. Larsen, New Times shifted to an investigative approach, offering pieces on the CIA, congressional committees, political spying, activism, the murder of Mary Pinchot Meyer, the cult or system of psychological training est and the JFK assassination "cover up". Contributors were up-and-coming freelance writers, many just out of college, including currently celebrated authors and media figures such as Geoffrey Wolff, Frank Rich, Nina Totenberg, Harry Stein, Roger Rapaport, Sam Merrill, David Black, Robert Ward, Tony Schwartz, Marshall Frady, J. Anthony Lukas, Joe McGinniss, Mike Royko, Studs Terkel, Nicholas von Hoffman and Ron Rosenbaum. Robert Sam Anson was Political Editor. The late NBC television executive Brandon Tartikoff was an occasional contributor. 

Typical of the magazine's later direction, one issue featured a cover depicting Bozo the Clown behind the Presidential podium, a broad comment on the mistakes and misadventures of then-President Gerald Ford. Another issue saluted the 10 Dumbest Congressmen, judging Iowa's newly elected Republican Senator Charles Grassley as the so-called King of Dumb. 

While New Times never found a sufficient base of advertisers, it was not for Hirsch's lack of publishing know-how. The final issue of the magazine was published on January 8, 1979. He launched The Runner magazine, one of the first of a new era of specialty "active lifestyle" monthlies in 1979, initially as a supplement to New Times.

References

External links
Phillip Nobile and Ron Rosenbaum, "The Curious Aftermath of JFK's Best and Brightest Affair," New Times, July 7, 1976, pp. 22-33.

News magazines published in the United States
Defunct political magazines published in the United States
Magazines established in 1973
Magazines disestablished in 1979